The Cambridgeshire Lodes are a series of man-made waterways, believed to be Roman in origin, located in the county of Cambridgeshire, England. Bottisham, Swaffham Bulbeck, Reach, Burwell, Wicken and Monks Lodes all connect to the River Cam, while Soham Lode connects to the River Great Ouse. All have been navigable historically, but some are no longer officially navigable.

Bottisham Lode was navigated throughout the 19th century, and although the flood gates at its mouth were replaced in 2001, it carries a "No unauthorised vessels" notice. Swaffham Bulbeck Lode has been rendered unnavigable by the removal of the lower lock gates, and the replacement of the upper lock gates with a guillotine gate which provides little headroom. Reach Lode is quite deep, as a result of the surrounding land sinking, and the banks being built up.

Burwell Lode is a tributary of Reach Lode, and is another deep lode. Barges were built and maintainted at Burwell until 1936, and it was used commercially until 1963, when carriage of sugar beet ceased. Wicken Lode is another tributary of Reach Lode, and was important for the carriage of peat and sedge. It runs through Wicken Fen, one of the oldest nature reserves in England, as the National Trust bought their first part of it in 1899. Soham Lode is more recent than most, probably dating from the 1790s. It ran by Soham Mere, a large inland lake which was drained in the late 18th century.

In 2007 a strategy plan considered options for the management of the lodes which included rebuilding most of them at a lower level, but concluded that maintaining the banks at the existing level was a better long-term solution.

History
Research by the Royal Commission on Historical Monuments published in 1972 confirmed the work of Major Gordon Fowler of the Fenland Research Committee that the Cambridgeshire lodes were of Roman origin; they were excavated to provide navigation to a series of villages to the east of the River Cam, and probably also drainage of the surrounding fenland.

The term "Lode" denoted a watercourse in Late Middle English, being derived from the Old English "lād," meaning way or course. It did not acquire its modern meaning of a vein of metal ore until the early 17th century.

Bottisham Lode

It is almost straight, running between embankments, and included a staunch (a primitive lock with a single gate), of which the chamber survives. Its water supply comes from Quy Water, which flows through a mill just above the village before entering the lode near to the location of a basin and wharf. In medieval times, navigation along Quy Water was also possible, as there is evidence of moorings in the village of Quy. The Swaffham and Bottisham Drainage Commissioners were responsible for the lode from 1767, and were empowered to build staunches and collect tolls. The lode was never wide enough to take fen lighters, but smaller boats used it for most of the 19th century.

In 1875, the Drainage Commissioners spent £294 on a flash lock, which had a flagstone floor, a chamber constructed of white bricks, a timber guillotine gate, and a mechanism for raising the gate made from cast-iron, supported by a timber frame.

Navigation on the lode ceased around 1900, and it is not currently navigable. The mill at Lode has been restored to working order by its owners, the National Trust. The timber-framed building dates from the late eighteenth century and has a low breastshot waterwheel. The mill machinery was replaced in 1868 by W Rawlings, and the external cladding dates from the 1934 and 1978 restoration.  There is a pumping station and a set of mitred flood doors at the entrance to the lode, which were replaced in 2001, but a "No unauthorised vessels" notice was displayed on the gates in 2008.

Swaffham Bulbeck Lode
Commercial End consists of a row of fine buildings, mainly dating from the late 17th and 18th century. The Commissioners of the Bedford Level were responsible for the drain during this period, and they cleared the channel and straightened the banks on several occasions in response to complaints. Use of the lode declined rapidly once the railways arrived in the area, and only the first  to Slade Farm are currently navigable, as shallow water and low bridges prevent access beyond this point. However, the Environment Agency have modified the upstream lock gate, in order to improve flood control, with the result that the headroom below the guillotine gate is too low for boats to enter the lode. The lower gates have also been removed.

Reach Lode
From Reach, a defensive rampart and ditch, called Devil's Dyke, ran for a further  in a straight line to Ditton Green. It was built in the Anglo-Saxon period, and is listed as a Scheduled Ancient Monument, while the chalk grasslands which it contains have resulted in it being a designated Site of Special Scientific Interest (SSSI).

The village of Reach has been a trading port since Roman times. From the 13th century, a fair was held there, and it was at this time that the last  of the Devils Dyke were levelled. Wharfs and basins were developed, and coasters brought a wide variety of products to Reach and to the fair. The coasters stopped when Denver Sluice was built on the River Great Ouse, but smaller vessels continued to trade in agricultural produce, timber and a type of building material called clunch, which were exported through Kings Lynn, while incoming trade included building materials, stone, salts, wines and spirits. A lock was built at the start of the lode in 1821, as a result of the passing of the Eau Brink Act, while the South Level Commissioners took over responsibility for the waterway in 1827. Trade declined rapidly after railways reached the area in the 1850s, but some carriers continued to operate, with the last load of 525 tonnes of clunch being shipped in the early 1930s, and some peat being carried for a few years after that.

In 2007 the Environment Agency considered options for lowering the level of Reach Load and possibly some of the other lodes, as a way to reduce the maintenance of the banks. The report concluded that maintaining them at their present level was still the best solution, and a policy of strengthening the embankments was adopted as the way to limit the risk of major repairs being needed in the future.

The Reach annual fair, which received a charter from King John, has been moved to the May bank holiday from its original Rogation Week date, to ensure that every Mayor of Cambridge, who by tradition opens the fair, gets to open one fair during a term of office. The movable date of Rogation Week meant that some mayors opened two fairs, and some did not open any.

Burwell Lode

The present course of the Lode was cut in the mid seventeenth century, replacing the previous course, which was referred to as the Old Lode. At Burwell, two branches diverge in opposite directions, both of which had wharves. 'Anchor Straits' to the south was used by coasters and 'Weirs' to the north was used by lighters.

Burwell became more important than Reach when T. T. Ball opened the Burwell Chemical Works, which was built between 1864 and 1865. Fertilizer was produced from coprolites, ancient fossilised dung extracted from the newly drained fens, using a process which had been developed by a man who lived locally. The works became the Patent Manure Works in the 1890s, and following a partnership, was owned by Colchester and Ball, who ran a fleet of three steam tugs and a large number of lighters, which were carrying around 10,000 tons a year by the early 20th century, despite the fact that the works had been served by a railway siding since 1900. Richard Ball had opened a brickworks nearby, which was served by a channel which became known as Factory Lode.

Prentice Brothers Ltd, who had built barges at Burwell until 1920, and repaired and maintained them there until 1936, took over the Manure Works in 1921. In addition to the fertilizer, the barges carried coal, stone and sugar beet, and the yellow bricks produced by the Burwell Brick Company. The toll structure was complicated, as the South Level Commissioners were responsible for both Burwell Lode and Reach Lode, but tolls of 3 pence (1.2p) per ton were payable to the Burwell Fen Drainage Commissioners, and a further 3 pence per ton for use of the connecting stretch of Reach Lode had to be paid to the Swaffham and Bottisham Drainage Commissioners.

The fertilizer company Fisons took over the factory in 1929. Prentice's lighters were bought by A. V. Jackson in 1936, and Jacksons continued to carry fertilizer until 1948. Trade in sugarbeet continued until 1963. Production of fertilizer at the site ceased in 1962, and the brickworks, which made up to 10 million bricks a year, finally closed in 1971.

It is also quite deep, and the 2007 Strategy Study considered the option of reconstructing it at a lower level, but did not recommend this action.

Wicken Lode

There is a right of public navigation as far as its junction with Monk's Lode, and the stretch beyond that is only navigable by local inhabitants. The lode is not as wide or deep as the adjacent lodes, and can only be navigated by smaller craft. The waterway continues as Monk's Lode and then the New River, although these are not navigable. Peat from Burwell Fen was brought up Wicken Lode for much of the 19th century, for distribution to local farms, and the trade only stopped in the 1940s when peat cutting was restricted. Sedge from the fen was transported by boat from the sites where it was cut to a wharf near the head of the lode.

Wicken Fen is one of the oldest nature reserves in England, as the National Trust bought their first part of it in 1899. Purchases have continued, and the Trust now manages  of wetland. It is not a true fen, as the area is higher than the surrounding land, but since 1956 the wetland has been maintained by a drainage windmill pump which was moved from its location at Adventurers Fen, to the south of the lode, and re-assembled to supply the Fen with water. The National Trust Warden's office includes a display which tells the history of the Fen and how it has been managed.

Soham Lode

Its origin is less well known than the other lodes, but it probably dates from the 1790s, when it was built to reduce flooding in the Soham and Fordham area, by carrying water from the River Snail, which formerly flowed into the River Lark, to join the Great Ouse instead. Soham is about halfway along it, and was once close to a large inland lake called Soham Mere, which was drained in the late 18th century.

There is no evidence that the Lode was navigable beyond Soham. Lighters brought cargoes of corn to a water mill at Soham, and later brought coal when steam engines replaced the water wheel. Barley and timber were other important cargoes. Railways did not reach Soham until 1879, and resulted in the rapid demise of water-borne transport. Commercial traffic ceased about 1900, and the lode was described as un-navigable in a report by H. Dunn in 1906. There was a sluice at the entrance to the lode, with two sets of mitre gates, pointing in opposite directions, one to prevent flood waters from the Great Ouse entering the lode, and the other to raise the water level in the lode to make navigation easier. When the Anglian Water Authority was created by Act of Parliament in 1977, the lode was not listed as a navigation, and their successors, the Environment Agency, have taken this to mean that there is no right of navigation.

There is now a pumping station and a set of mitred flood doors at the start of the lode, and although it is not officially navigable, two narrowboats navigated part of it in 2001, and there is increasing evidence that boats can and do use it as far as it is possible.

Points of interest

Bibliography

References

See also

 Canals of Great Britain

Canals in England
Transport in Cambridgeshire
Buildings and structures in Cambridgeshire